is a Japanese football player. He plays for SC Sagamihara.

Playing career
Kyosuke Narita joined to J3 League club; SC Sagamihara in 2015.

References

External links

1992 births
Living people
Hannan University alumni
Association football people from Shizuoka Prefecture
Japanese footballers
J3 League players
SC Sagamihara players
Association football defenders